The 1848 Missouri gubernatorial election was held on August 7, 1848, the Democratic nominee, Austin Augustus King, defeated Whig candidate James S. Rollins.

Results

References

Missouri
1848
Gubernatorial
August 1848 events